Herman Matzen (July 15, 1861 – April 22, 1938)  American sculptor and educator, born in Denmark.

Early years

Matzen studied at the Academy of Fine Arts in Munich and the Academy of Fine Arts in Berlin before immigrating to the United States. After moving first to Detroit he ultimately settled in Cleveland.

Selected works

 Justice and Law,  Summit County Courthouse, Akron, Ohio,  1908
 Monumental statues of Cain and Abel at the Lake County Court House, Painesville, Ohio,  1909
 Commodore Oliver Hazard Perry Monument, with William Walcutt, Wade Park, Cleveland, Ohio, 1929
 The Angel of Death Victorious or The Haserot Angel located at the Lake View Cemetery, 1924
 Friedrich von Schiller, Belle Isle Park 1908.

References

19th-century American sculptors
1861 births
1938 deaths
Prussian Academy of Arts alumni
20th-century sculptors
19th-century sculptors
National Sculpture Society members
Cleveland School (arts community)
Cleveland Institute of Art faculty
20th-century American sculptors